A saveloy is a type of highly seasoned sausage, usually bright red, normally boiled and available in most fish and chip shops around England. It is occasionally also available fried in batter.

Etymology 
Its first known use in the English language in this meaning was 1784.  is still the name of a sausage in Italy; it is longer and thinner than standard Italian sausages.

Ingredients 
Although the saveloy was traditionally made from pork brains, the ingredients of a shop-bought sausage are typically pork (58%), water, rusk, pork fat, potato starch, salt, emulsifiers (tetrasodium diphosphate, disodium diphosphate), white pepper, spices, dried sage, preservatives (sodium nitrite, potassium nitrate), and beef collagen casing.

The saveloy is mostly eaten with chips.

England 

Popular in the North East of England, saveloys are sometimes eaten in a "Saveloy Dip" sandwich: the bun is dipped in the water which the saveloy is boiled in or in gravy, with a layer of stuffing and pease pudding, additionally seasoned with English mustard. In the rest of England it is most commonly eaten from fish and chip shops.

Australia and New Zealand 
The saveloy is eaten in Australia and New Zealand, often dipped in batter and deep fried, when it is known as a “battered sav”. 

This distinction may be due to frankfurters’ popularisation in that country (as the main ingredient in hot dogs). Saveloys also tend to have more seasoning and are thicker.

Despite "frankfurter" sausage makers being the target of violence in World War I, the story that saveloys were once frankfurters, renamed due to anti-German sentiment, is purely apocryphal, as far as Australia is concerned.

In Australia, saveloys are usually a beef-pork blend. In New Zealand, saveloys are usually a lamb-pork-beef blend (which distinguishes them from frankfurters which are a pork-beef blend). As in England, they are sold at fish-and-chip shops, as well as bought from supermarkets, to be simmered at home. 

Saveloys are often the basis of the New Zealand battered-sausage-on-a-stick "hot dog", very similar to the US wheat-battered variant of the corn dog as sold at fairgrounds and shows. The Australian showground version is often called a "dagwood dog", when prepared on site (and should not be confused with the "pluto pup", equivalent to the US Pronto Pup, a mass-produced, pre-prepared product that is essentially the same, but which invariably uses frankfurters, rather than saveloys and can often be found at takeaway shops). 

In South Australia and Tasmania, up to at least the early 1980s, the "sav and roll" was popular football fare especially at country matches; it was a saveloy heated in a wood-fired "copper" (boiler), placed in a split bread roll, and liberally covered with tomato sauce.

A cocktail sausage is a smaller version of the saveloy, about a quarter of the size; in Australia sometimes called a "baby sav", a "footy frank" or a "little boy", and in New Zealand and Queensland called a "cheerio". These are a popular children's party food in New Zealand and Australia, often served hot, with tomato sauce.

United States 
A type of hot dog which is almost indistinguishable from the saveloy is popular in the state of Maine, where it is commonly known as a "red hot" or "red snapper".

In popular culture 
In The Pickwick Papers (Chapter LV) Solomon Pell, an attorney at the Insolvent Court, is described as "regaling himself, business being rather slack, with a cold collation of an Abernethy biscuit and a saveloy".

Saveloy is also eaten by Fagin in Oliver Twist and it also appears in the 1968 musical film based on the novel, directed by Carol Reed, when it is mentioned in the number "Food, Glorious Food".

A saveloy is passed from Paul McGann's character (I) to Withnail and subsequently to Danny in Bruce Robinson's 1987 film Withnail and I.

The phrase "oi oi saveloy" is sometimes used in the United Kingdom as a greeting.

See also 

 Battered sausage
 List of sausages

References

External links

Australian sausages
British sausages
Cooked sausages
New Zealand sausages